MML Capital (“MML”) is a provider of growth capital (investing both debt and equity), to established but growing companies in Europe and the U.S. It seeks to partner management teams, supporting their growth strategy by providing capital for organic and acquisitive growth, both on a local and international basis.

History 
The firm was founded in 1988 and has since invested more than $3 billion. The company is head quartered in London with offices in New York, Dublin and Paris. MML Capital has expanded successfully over the last 15 years is now a multi-strategy private equity investor run and co-owned by CEOs Bal Johal and Ian Wallis and Chaired by Rory Brooks the original founder. The business has built a reputation for being a high quality bespoke private equity investment firm that is highly consultative in its approach. 

The firm runs 4 strategies across 10 funds with a remarkably low loss ratio whilst delivering strong private equity results.

MML has a culture synonymous with a new age investment firm and is dedicated to being 'fair and commercial' in all its dealings. Consequently the firm has the support of top-tier global financial institutions, corporate finance industry and has invested, developed and exited some of the most successful private equity businesses.

Geographic presence 
MML’s investment team consists of 40 investment professionals operating from offices in London, Dublin, Paris and New York. MML has a track record of assisting its portfolio companies in formulating and executing cross border growth strategies.

The business has a reputation for consistency and has a long standing senior partnership group including Luke Jones, Henry-Louis Merieux, Richard Mayers and Robert Devonshire.

Investment strategy 
MML invests alongside management teams, often taking a non-controlling stake, in contrast to a mainstream private equity takeover approach. It invests up to €10-£80 million of capital in each business to facilitate the financing of acquisitions, supporting organic growth, or consolidating the shareholder base whilst retaining or enhancing the management team’s equity in the business. 

MML invests predominately in B2B sectors, investing in cash generative business with stable and viable cash flows operating in robust and defensible end markets.

Affiliated funds 
MML Partnership Capital VII is the firms most long standing strategy which is enhanced by an Enterprise Fund I which seeks to deploy smaller tickets following a similar strategy. 

MML establish a dedicated fund to Irish SMEs, MML Growth Capital Ireland II in 2013 which has grown to become a market leader on the Island of Ireland.

The firm is expanding its activity into the closely associated Value-added Infrastructure market and is working with ex senior Macquarie executive Andrew Honan to enter this market. 

MML has a strategic relationship with an affiliated fund, Accession Mezzanine Capital III which operates from offices in Vienna, Warsaw, Budapest and Bucharest.

References

External links
MML Capital

Financial services companies established in 1988
Investment companies of the United Kingdom